Andrey Alexandrovich Mishkevich (born 27 November 1992) is a former Russian professional association football player.

Club career
He made his Russian Football National League debut for FC Zhemchuzhina-Sochi on 27 October 2010 in a game against FC Volga Nizhny Novgorod.

External links
 
 

1992 births
Sportspeople from Volgograd
Living people
Russian footballers
Association football goalkeepers
FC Zhemchuzhina Sochi players
FC Sokol Saratov players
FC Olimpia Volgograd players
FC Angusht Nazran players
FC Rotor Volgograd players